Qusay Habib (born 15 April 1987 in Qamishli, Syria) is a Syrian footballer. He currently plays for  Al-Wahda SC, which competes in the Syrian Premier League the top division in Syria. He plays as a midfielder, wearing the number 30 jersey for Al-Wahda SC and for the Syrian national football team he wears the number 9 shirt.

Club career
Habib started his professional career with Al-Jehad. In January 2008, he transferred to Al-Wahda. Following the 2009–10 season, Habib signed for recently promoted Syrian Premier League club Al-Shorta. He joined Baghdad in October 2013.

International career
Habib has been a regular for the Syrian national football team since 2010 and he debuted in a 14 November 2010 International Friendly against Bahrain.

Syria's coach Valeriu Tiţa included Habib in his squad for the 2011 AFC Asian Cup finals in Qatar, but did not start him in any of the three group games. Habib came on as a second-half substitute in the victory over Saudi Arabia and he plays at the second-halftime in the 1–2 defeat against Jordan.

References

External links

1987 births
Living people
Syrian footballers
Association football midfielders
Syria international footballers
Syrian expatriate footballers
Expatriate footballers in Iraq
Syrian expatriate sportspeople in Iraq
Al-Shorta Damascus players
Al-Wahda SC (Syria) players
People from Qamishli
2011 AFC Asian Cup players
Amanat Baghdad players
Syrian Premier League players